Drew Rutherford (4 October 1953 – 14 December 2005) was a professional footballer who played most of his career for St Johnstone F.C.

Although Edinburgh-born, Rutherford lived most of his life in Fife and started his professional career at East Fife. After four years with the Methil club, he signed for St Johnstone which was where he remained for most of his playing days.

Playing in the centre of defence for St Johnstone over a span of nine seasons, he set a record for most appearances. This record stood until 2009, when it was surpassed by goalkeeper Alan Main. Rutherford was also club captain and a popular player with the club's supporters. His time at Perth began in February 1977 and he made a total of 342 appearances (plus five as a substitute) before leaving the club in May 1985. Despite being a defender, he managed 18 goals for St Johnstone.

After leaving St Johnstone he had a short spell with another Fife club, Cowdenbeath, before retiring from the game.

Rutherford was held in such high regard by St Johnstone fans that, despite twenty years having passed since his time at the club, a benefit night was organised to raise funds after hearing of his illness. Although Rutherford himself was too ill to attend, his family was represented along with many of his former teammates.

Rutherford died in 2005 from cancer.

References

 Rutherford's obituary from St Johnstone F.C. official website
 Who's Who of St. Johnstone 1946 to 1992. Reference book compiled by Jim Slater

External links

1953 births
2005 deaths
Scottish footballers
St Johnstone F.C. players
East Fife F.C. players
Cowdenbeath F.C. players
Deaths from cancer in Scotland
Footballers from Edinburgh
Association football central defenders
Scottish Football League players